Olivia Scott Welch, also known as Olivia Welch, is an American actress. She portrayed Samantha "Sam" Fraser in Netflix horror film trilogy Fear Street.

Life and career
Welch was born in the small suburb of Hurst, Texas, United States, between Dallas and Fort Worth, with movie-loving parents and grandparents, so she soon became interested in art and particularly acting. She has a younger sister.

At the age of 11 she was already taking her first acting classes and during high school, she traveled to Los Angeles on some occasions, participating in series such as Agent Carter and Modern Family.
Eventually, after her graduation she settled in California to pursue a professional career.

In 2019, she got the lead role of Sam Fraser in the film trilogy Fear Street, which premiered in July 2021 on Netflix; the story begins in 1994 and focuses on a group of teenagers tormented by a curse and a mystery of more than 300 years that haunts their town, in which current time Sam is persecuted by murderers from different times and Deena seeks to save her from that curse. Welch also starred in the television series Panic as Heather Nill, based on the novel of the same name by Lauren Oliver, which premiered on May 28, 2021 on Amazon Prime Video.

In August 2021, it was reported that she has been cast as the lead role in an upcoming film The Blue Rose as Detective Lilly, which is set in the 1950's and mixes various genres such as fiction and horror; the plot is around a pair of young detectives who during an investigation of a homicide case find themselves in a dark alternate reality.

Filmography

Film

Television

References

External links

Living people
American film actresses
American television actresses
Actresses from Texas
21st-century American actresses
Year of birth missing (living people)